Georgi Ivanov (Bulgarian: Георги Иванов; born 13 March 1980 in Madan) is a Bulgarian footballer who plays as a defender for Hebar Pazardzhik.

References

External links
 
 

1980 births
Living people
Bulgarian footballers
Association football defenders
Botev Plovdiv players
FC Maritsa Plovdiv players
FC Montana players
PFC Vidima-Rakovski Sevlievo players
FC Oborishte players
FC Botev Vratsa players
FC Levski Karlovo players
FC Hebar Pazardzhik players
First Professional Football League (Bulgaria) players
Second Professional Football League (Bulgaria) players